William Priestly MacIntosh (1857 – 9 January 1930) was a sculptor in Sydney, Australia. His works often decorated significant public buildings in Sydney, Brisbane, Canberra and major provincial centres. Many of them are now heritage-listed.

Early life
MacIntosh was born near Ayr in Scotland in 1857 and died in Sydney in 1930. Before immigrating to New South Wales in 1880, he studied anatomy and sculpture in Edinburgh. By 1896 MacIntosh was "executing every kind of sculpture", working from a yard in Hereford Street, Forest Lodge. He was still actively working at the time of his death at his residence and studio in Kogarah.

Works

His works include:
 Lands Department building, Sydney (1890–1891)
 Sydney Technical College, Sydney (1891)
 Queen Victoria Building, Sydney (1898–1899)
 Land Administration Building, Brisbane (1903–1904)
 Boer War Memorial, Allora, Queensland (1904)
 Queensland Government Printing Office, Brisbane (1910)
 Commonwealth Bank building, Sydney (1916)
 Family Services Building, Brisbane (1920)
 Old Parliament House, Canberra (1926)

References

1857 births
1930 deaths
19th-century Australian sculptors
20th-century Australian sculptors
Architectural sculptors
Scottish emigrants to Australia